An origin myth is a myth that describes the origin of some feature of the  natural or social world. One type of origin myth is the  creation or  cosmogonic myth, a story that describes the creation of the world. However, many cultures have stories set in a time after a first origin - such stories aim to account for the beginnings of natural phenomena or of human institutions within a preexisting universe.

In  Graeco-Roman scholarship, the terms etiological myth and aition (from the Ancient Greek αἴτιον, "cause") are sometimes used for a myth that explains an origin, particularly how an object or custom came into existence.

Nature of origin myths
Every origin myth is a tale of creation: origin myths describe how some reality came into existence. In many cases, origin myths also justify the established order by explaining that it was established by sacred forces (see section on "Social function" below). The distinction between cosmogonic myths and origin myths is not clear-cut. A myth about the origin of some part of the world necessarily presupposes the existence of the world—which, for many cultures, presupposes a cosmogonic myth. In this sense, one can think of origin myths as building upon and extending their cultures' cosmogonic myths. In fact, in traditional cultures, the recitation of an origin myth is often prefaced with the recitation of the cosmogonic myth.

In some academic circles, the term "myth" properly refers only to origin and cosmogonic myths. For example, many folklorists reserve the label "myth" for stories about creation. Traditional stories that do not focus on origins fall into the categories of "legend" and "folk tale", which folklorists distinguish from myth.

According to historian Mircea Eliade, for many traditional cultures, nearly every sacred story qualifies as an origin myth. Traditional humans tend to model their behavior after sacred events, seeing their life as an "eternal return" to the mythical age. Because of this conception, nearly every sacred story describes events that established a new paradigm for human behavior, and thus nearly every sacred story is a story about a creation.

Social function

An origin myth often functions to justify the current state of affairs. In traditional cultures, the entities and forces described in origin myths are often considered sacred. Thus, by attributing the state of the universe to the actions of these entities and forces, origin myths give the current order an aura of sacredness: "Myths reveal that the World, man, and life have a supernatural origin and history, and that this history is significant, precious, and exemplary." Many cultures instil the expectation that people take mythical gods and heroes as their role models, imitating their deeds and upholding the customs they established:

When the missionary and ethnologist C. Strehlow asked the Australian Arunta why they performed certain ceremonies, the answer was always: "Because the ancestors so commanded it." The Kai of New Guinea refused to change their way of living and working, and they explained: "It was thus that the Nemu (the Mythical Ancestors) did, and we do likewise." Asked the reason for a particular detail in a ceremony, a Navaho chanter answered: "Because the Holy People did it that way in the first place." We find exactly the same justification in the prayer that accompanies a primitive Tibetan ritual: "As it has been handed down from the beginning of the earth’s creation, so must we sacrifice. … As our ancestors in ancient times did—so do we now."

Founding myths unite people and tend to include mystical events along the way to make "founders" seem more desirable and heroic. Ruling monarchs or aristocracies may allege descent from mythical founders/gods/heroes in order to legitimate their control. For example: Julius Caesar and his relatives claimed Aeneas (and through Aeneas, the goddess Venus) as an ancestor.

Founding myth

A "founding myth" or etiological myth (Greek aition) explains either:

 the origins of a ritual or of the founding of a city
 the ethnogenesis of a group presented as a genealogy with a founding father and thus of a nation (natio, 'birth')
 the spiritual origins of a belief, philosophy, discipline, or idea - presented as a narrative

Beginning in protohistorical times many civilizations and kingdoms adopted some version of a heroic model national origin myth, including the Hittites and Zhou dynasty in the Bronze Age; the Scythians, Wusun, Romans and Goguryeo in Antiquity; Turks and Mongols during the Middle Ages; and the Dzungar Khanate in the late Renaissance.

In the founding myth of the Zhou dynasty in China, Lady Yuan makes a ritual sacrifice to conceive, then becomes pregnant after stepping into the footprint of the King of Heaven. She gives birth to a son, Hou Ji, whom she leaves alone in dangerous places where he is protected by sheep, cattle, birds, and woodcutters. Convinced that he is a supernatural being, she takes him back and raises him. When he grows to adulthood, he takes the position of Master of Horses in the court of Emperor Yao, and becomes successful at growing grains, gourds and beans. According to the legend, he becomes founder of the Zhou dynasty after overthrowing the evil ruler of Shang.

Like other civilizations, the Scythians also claimed descent from the son of the god of heaven. One day, the daughter of the god of the Dnieper River stole a young man's horses while he was herding his cattle, and forced him to lie with her before returning them. From this union, she conceived three sons, giving them their father's greatbow when they came of age. The son who could draw the bow would become king. All tried, but only the youngest was successful. On his attempt, three golden objects fell from the sky: a plow and yoke, a sword, and a cup. When the eldest two tried to pick them up, fire prevented them. After this, it was decided the youngest son, Scythes, would become king, and his people would be known as Scythians.

The Torah (or Pentateuch, as biblical scholars sometimes call it) is the collective name for the first five books of the Bible: Genesis, Exodus, Leviticus, Numbers, and Deuteronomy. It forms the charter myth of Israel, the story of the people's origins and the foundations of their culture and institutions, and it is a fundamental principle of Judaism that the relationship between God and his chosen people was set out on Mount Sinai through the Torah, though many stories are borrowed from older religions.

A founding myth may serve as the primary exemplum, as the myth of Ixion was the original Greek example of a murderer rendered unclean by his crime, who needed cleansing (catharsis) of his impurity.

Founding myths feature prominently in Greek mythology. "Ancient Greek rituals were bound to prominent local groups and hence to specific localities", Walter Burkert has observed, "i.e. the sanctuaries and altars that had been set up for all time". Thus Greek and Hebrew founding myths established the special relationship between a deity and local people, who traced their origins from a hero and authenticated their ancestral rights through the founding myth. Greek founding myths often embody a justification for the ancient overturning of an older, archaic order, reformulating a historical event anchored in the social and natural world to valorize current community practices, creating symbolic narratives of "collective importance" enriched with metaphor in order to account for traditional chronologies, and constructing an etiology considered to be plausible among those with a cultural investment.

In the Greek view, the mythic past had deep roots in historic time, its legends treated as facts, as Carlo Brillante has noted, its heroic protagonists seen as links between the "age of origins" and the mortal, everyday world that succeeded it. A modern translator of Apollonius' Argonautica has noted, of the many aitia embedded as digressions in that Hellenistic epic, that "crucial to social stability had to be the function of myths in providing explanations, authorization or empowerment for the present in terms of origins: this could apply, not only to foundations or charter myths and genealogical trees (thus supporting family or territorial claims) but also to personal moral choices." In the period after Alexander the Great expanded the Hellenistic world, Greek poetry—Callimachus wrote a whole work simply titled Aitia—is replete with founding myths. Simon Goldhill employs the metaphor of sedimentation in describing Apollonius' laying down of layers "where each object, cult, ritual, name, may be opened... into a narrative of origination, and where each narrative, each event, may lead to a cult, ritual, name, monument."

A notable example is the myth of the foundation of Rome—the tale of Romulus and Remus, which Virgil in turn broadens in his Aeneid with the odyssey of Aeneas and his razing of Lavinium, and his son Iulus's later relocation and rule of the famous twins' birthplace Alba Longa, and their descent from his royal line, thus fitting perfectly into the already established canon of events. Similarly, the Old Testament's story of the Exodus serves as the founding myth for the community of Israel, telling how God delivered the Israelites from slavery and how they therefore belonged to him through the Covenant of Mount Sinai.

During the Middle Ages, founding myths of the medieval communes of northern Italy manifested the increasing self-confidence of the urban population and the will to find a Roman origin, however tenuous and legendary. In 13th-century Padua, when each commune looked for a Roman founder - and if one was not available, invented one—a legend had been current in the city, attributing its foundation to the Trojan Antenor.

Larger-than-life heroes continue to bolster the origin-myths of many newer nations and societies. In modern-era colonial contexts, waves of individuals and groups come to the fore in popular history as shaping and exemplifying the ideals of a group: explorers followed by conquerors followed by developers/exploiters. Note for example the conquistadors of the Iberian empires, the bandeirantes in Brazil, the coureurs des bois in Canada, the Cossacks and the promyshlenniki in Siberia and in Alaska, the bands of pioneers in the central and western United States, and the voortrekkers in Southern Africa.

Foundation stories
Foundational stories are accounts of the development of cities and nations. A foundational story represents the view that the creation of the city is a human achievement. Human control and the removal of wild, uncontrolled nature is underlined. There are two versions of foundational stories: civilization story and degradation story.

Civilization stories take a view of nature as dangerous and wild. The development of the city is seen as a successful distancing of humans from nature. Nature is locked out, and humans take pride in doing so successfully. In 1984 the geographer Yi-Fu Tuan suggested ranking cities according to their distance to natural rhythms and cycles.

Degradation stories (also called pollution stories) take a different stance. The city is seen as spoiling the landscape of the ecological relations that existed before the city was established. There is a sense of guilt for degrading the intact system of nature. In degradation stories true nature only exists outside the city.

See also

 Creation myth
 Pourquoi story
 Dindsenchas
 Just-so story
 List of national founders
 Mythomoteur
 National myth
 Origin story

References

Further reading
 Belayche, Nicole. "Foundation myths in Roman Palestine. Traditions and reworking", in Ton Derks, Nico Roymans (ed.), Ethnic Constructs in Antiquity: The Role of Power and Tradition (Amsterdam, Amsterdam University Press, 2009) (Amsterdam Archaeological Studies, 13), 167-188.
 Campbell, Joseph. The Masks of God: Primitive Mythology. New York: Penguin Books, 1976.
 Campbell, Joseph. Transformations of Myth through Time. New York: Harper and Row, 1990.
 Darshan, Guy. "The Origins of the Foundation Stories Genre in the Hebrew Bible and Ancient Eastern Mediterranean", JBL, 133,4 (2014), 689–709. 
 Eliade, Mircea. A History of Religious Ideas: Volume 1: From the Stone Age to the Eleusinian Mysteries. 1976. Trans. Willard R. Trask. Chicago: The U of Chicago P, 1981.
 Eliade, Mircea. Myth and Reality. Trans. Willard Trask. New York: Harper & Row, 1963.
 Encyclopedia of Ancient Myths and Culture. London: Quantum, 2004.
 Lincoln, Bruce. Discourse and the Construction of Society: Comparative Studies of Myth, Ritual, and Classification. 1989. Repr. New York: Oxford U P, 1992.
 Long, Charles H. Alpha: The Myths of Creation. New York: George Braziller, 1963.
 Paden, William E. Interpreting the Sacred: Ways of Viewing Religion. 1992. Boston: Beacon P, 2003.
 Ricoeur, Paul. “Introduction: The Symbolic Function of Myths.” Theories of Myth: From Ancient Israel and Greece to Freud, Jung, Campbell, and Levi-Strauss. Ed. Robert A. Segal. New York & London: Garland, 1996. 327–340.
 Schilbrack, Kevin. Ed. Thinking Through Myths: Philosophical Perspectives. London & New York: Routledge, 2002.
 Segal, Robert A. Joseph Campbell: An Introduction. 1987. Repr. New York: Penguin 1997.
 Segal, Robert A. Myth: A Very Short Introduction. Oxford: Oxford University Press, 2004.
 Segal, Robert A. Theories of Myth: From Ancient Israel and Greece to Freud, Jung, Campbell, and Levi-Strauss: Philosophy, Religious Studies, and Myth. Vol. 3. New York & London: Garland, 1996.
 Segal, Robert A. Theorizing about Myth. Amherst: U of Massachusetts P, 1999.
 Spence, Lewis. The Outlines of Mythology: The Thinker’s Library—No. 99. 1944. Whitefish, MT: Kessinger, 2007.
 von Franz, Marie-Louise. Creation Myths: Revised Edition. Boston: Shambhala, 1995.
 Wright, M.R. “Models, Myths, and Metaphors.” Cosmology in Antiquity. 1995.

External links

 
Cultural anthropology
Literary concepts
History of religion
Cosmogony